Norman or Norman French (Guernésiais: ,) is a Romance language which can be classified as one of the langues d'oïl, which also includes French, Picard and Walloon. The name "Norman French" is  sometimes used to describe not only the Norman language, but also the administrative languages of Anglo-Norman and Law French used in England. For the most part, the written forms of Norman and modern French are mutually intelligible. This intelligibility was largely caused by the Norman language's planned adaptation to French orthography (writing).

History

When Norse Vikings from modern day Scandinavia arrived in Neustria, in the western part of the then Kingdom of the Franks, and settled the land that became known as Normandy, these North-Germanic–speaking people came to live among a local Gallo-Romance–speaking population. In time, the communities converged, so that Normandy continued to form the name of the region while the original Norsemen were largely assimilated by the Gallo-Romance people, adopting their speech but still contributing some elements from Old Norse language and Norse culture. Later, when conquering England, the Norman rulers in England would eventually assimilate, thereby adopting the speech of the local English. In both cases, the elites contributed elements of their own language to the newly enriched languages that developed in the territories.

In Normandy, the Norman language inherited only some 150 words from Old Norse.

Geographical distribution
Norman is spoken in mainland Normandy in France, where it has no official status, but is classed as a regional language. It is taught in a few colleges near Cherbourg-Octeville.

In the Channel Islands, the Norman language has developed separately, but not in isolation, to form:

 Jèrriais (in Jersey)
 Guernésiais or Dgèrnésiais or Guernsey French (in Guernsey)
 Sercquiais (or Sarkese, in Sark) 
 Auregnais (in Alderney)

The British and Irish governments recognize Jèrriais and Guernésiais as regional languages within the framework of the British–Irish Council. Sercquiais is in fact a descendant of the 16th-century Jèrriais used by the original colonists from Jersey who settled the then uninhabited island.

The last first-language speakers of Auregnais, the dialect of Norman spoken on Alderney, died during the 20th century, although some rememberers are still alive. The dialect of Herm also lapsed at an unknown date; the patois spoken there was likely Guernésiais (Herm was not inhabited all year round in the Norman culture's heyday).

An isogloss termed the "Joret line" (ligne Joret) separates the northern and southern dialects of the Norman language (the line runs from Granville, Manche to the French-speaking Belgian border in the province of Hainaut and Thiérache). Dialectal differences also distinguish western and eastern dialects.

Three different standardized spellings are used: continental Norman, Jèrriais, and Dgèrnésiais. These represent the different developments and particular literary histories of the varieties of Norman. Norman may therefore be described as a pluricentric language.

The Anglo-Norman dialect of Norman served as a language of administration in England following the Norman conquest of England in 1066. This left a legacy of Law French in the language of English courts (though it was also influenced by Parisian French). In Ireland, Norman remained strongest in the area of south-east Ireland, where the Hiberno-Normans invaded in 1169. Norman remains in (limited) use for some very formal legal purposes in the UK, such as when the monarch gives royal assent to an Act of Parliament using the phrase, "Le Roy (la Reyne) le veult" ("The King (the Queen) wills it").

The Norman conquest of southern Italy in the 11th and 12th centuries brought the language to Sicily and the southern part of the Italian Peninsula, where it may have left a few words in the Sicilian language. See: Norman and French influence on Sicilian.

Literature in Norman ranges from early Anglo-Norman literature through the 19th-century Norman literary renaissance to modern writers (see list of Norman-language writers).

 the Norman language remains strongest in the less accessible areas of the former Duchy of Normandy: the Channel Islands and the Cotentin Peninsula (Cotentinais) in the west, and the Pays de Caux (Cauchois dialect) in the east. Ease of access from Paris and the popularity of the coastal resorts of central Normandy, such as Deauville, in the 19th century led to a significant loss of distinctive Norman culture in the central low-lying areas of Normandy.

Old French influences
Norman French preserves a number of Old French words which have been lost in Modern French. Examples of Norman French words of Old French origin:

Examples of Norman French words with -ei instead of -oi in Standard French words 

Examples of Norman French words with c- / qu- and g- instead of  ch- and j in Standard French

Norse influences

Examples of Norman words of Norse origin:

In some cases, Norse words adopted in Norman have been borrowed into French – and more recently some of the English words used in French can be traced back to Norman origins.

Influence of Norman on English language 

Following the Norman conquest of England in 1066, the Norman and other languages and dialects spoken by the new rulers of England were used during several hundred years, developing into the unique insular dialect now known as Anglo-Norman French, and leaving traces of specifically Norman words that can be distinguished from the equivalent lexical items in French:

Other borrowings, such as canvas, captain, cattle and kennel, exemplify how Norman retained Latin /k/ that was not retained in French.

In the United Kingdom, Acts of Parliament are confirmed with the words "Le Roy le veult" ("The King wishes it") and other Norman phrases are used on formal occasions as legislation progresses.

Norman immigration in Canada

Norman immigrants to North America also introduced some "Normanisms" to Quebec French and the French language in Canada generally. Joual, a working class sociolect of Quebec, in particular exhibits a Norman influence. For example the word "placoter" can mean both to splash around or to chatter comes from the Normand French word "clapoter" which means the same thing.

See also

Norman toponymy
Joret line

References

Sources
Essai de grammaire de la langue normande, UPN, 1995. .
V'n-ous d'aveu mei? UPN, 1984.
La Normandie dialectale, 1999, 
Alain Marie, Les auteurs patoisants du Calvados, 2005. .
Roger Jean Lebarbenchon, Les Falaises de la Hague, 1991. .
Jean-Louis Vaneille, Les patoisants bas-normands, n.d., Saint-Lô.
André Dupont, Dictionnaire des patoisants du Cotentin, Société d'archéologie de la Manche, Saint-Lô, 1992.
 Geraint Jennings and Yan Marquis, "The Toad and the Donkey: an anthology of Norman literature from the Channel Islands", 2011,

External links
 

 
Languages of France
Endangered Romance languages
Languages of Sicily
Channel Islands
Languages of the United Kingdom
Oïl languages